Roman Vasylovych Shpek (November 10, 1954, Broshniv-Osada, Ivano-Frankivsk region) is a Ukrainian diplomat and statesman.

People's Deputy of Ukraine of the II convocation (1994-1997) and Minister of Economy of Ukraine in 1993-1995.

He holds a diplomatic rank of the Ambassador Extraordinary and Plenipotentiary (2002). Permanent Representative of Ukraine to the European Union in 2000-2007. He was a member of the National Bank of Ukraine. Minister of Economy of Ukraine in 1993-1995.

He was a senior adviser of PJSC "Alfa-Bank (Ukraine)" (Kyiv). Since October 2019, Chairman of the Supervisory Board of Alfa-Bank Ukraine.

Education
In 1976, he graduated with honours from Ukrainian National Forestry University majoring in "Engineering and technology" (started studying in 1971); in 1991, he graduated from the International Institute of Management (IIM-Kyiv) and gained an MBA in International Economics.

Career
In 1976-1978 - he worked as engineer, Chief of Osmoloda Forestry Enterprise in Rozhniativ Raion, Ivano-Frankivsk region, Ukraine.

In 1978-1985 - Engineering Officer, from 1981 – Director of Verkhovynsky Forestry Enterprise in Ivano-Frankivsk region.

In 1985-1989 - Director of Vorokhtiansky Forestry Enterprise in Ivano-Frankivsk region.

In 1989-1992 - Deputy Chairman of the State Committee of Ukraine for the wood industry.

From March 1992 to October 1992 – Minister of the Cabinet of Ministers of Ukraine in Affairs of State Property Privatization and De-monopolization of Industry.

In 1992-1993 - First Deputy Minister of Economy of Ukraine.

In 1993 Shpek was appointed Minister of Economy of Ukraine.

From May 11, 1994 – May 12, 1998 – People’s deputy of Ukraine of the II convocation (elected in the 1994 Ukrainian parliamentary election as a single-mandate candidate from Ivano-Frankivsk region).

In 1995-1996 - Deputy Prime Minister for Economic Affairs of Ukraine.

In 1996-2000 - Head of the National Agency for Reconstruction and Development, (from 1998 - National Agency for Development and European Integration).

In 2000-2008 - ambassador, Head of the Permanent Representative of Ukraine to the European Union.

In January 2008, Mr. Shpek quitted the government service and became Vice-President of Alfa-Bank (Ukraine). In 2010, he became a member of the Committee for Economic Reforms of Ukraine.

On 16 April 2010, he became a member of the NBU Council. In order not to combine work in the NBU Council with operating activities in the commercial bank, he became a senior advisor to JSC Alfa-Bank in October 2010.

In parallel, in 2010 - 2014, he was appointed Advisor to the President of Ukraine.

On 27 January 2014, he became a chairman of the Independent Association of the Banks of Ukraine (IABU).

Since October 2017 he was appointed as the chairman of the Supervisory Board of PJSC Ukrsotsbank, later - JSC Ukrsotsbank.

The merger of Alfa-Bank and Ukrsotsbank was completed in autumn 2019. Therefore, on 15 October 2019, Roman Shpek joined the Supervisory Board of Alfa-Bank and became a Chairman of the Supervisory Board of Alfa-Bank Ukraine.

Honours and awards
 2003, 11 - Order of Merit, 3rd class (Ukraine)

References

External links
 Roman Shpek. Former Minister of Ukraine and Adviser to the President of Ukraine
 Mission of Ukraine to the European Union
 Roman Speck Shuster LIVE Weekdays 16.10 2014
 Roman Speck: "The main theme of IMF negotiations with Ukraine on the new stand-by program will be the public finance deficit."
 Shpek: Association with the EU will give Ukraine a sense of security
 8th Yalta Annual Meeting Diaries - Roman Shpek

1954 births
Living people
People from Ivano-Frankivsk Oblast
Ukrainian National Forestry University alumni
Ukrainian bankers
Ambassadors of Ukraine to the European Union
Economy ministers of Ukraine
Second convocation members of the Verkhovna Rada
Recipients of the Order of Merit (Ukraine), 3rd class